The 2022–23 Xavier Musketeers men's basketball team represents Xavier University during the 2022–23 NCAA Division I men's basketball season as a member of the Big East Conference. Led by Sean Miller in the first season of his second stint after coaching the Musketeers from 2004 to 2009, they play their home games at the Cintas Center in Cincinnati, Ohio.

Previous season
The Musketeers finished the 2021–22 season 23–13, 8–11 in Big East play to finish in a tie for seventh place. They lost in the first round of the Big East tournament to Butler. The team received an at-large bid to the National Invitation Tournament where they defeated Cleveland State, Florida, Vanderbilt, and St. Bonaventure to advance to the championship game. There they defeated Texas A&M to win the NIT championship. 

Head coach Travis Steele was fired on March 16, 2022, the day after the first win in the NIT. Assistant coach Jonas Hayes was named the interim head coach and coached the team for the four remaining games in the NIT. 

On March 19, the school named former Xavier and Arizona head coach Sean Miller the team's new head coach. Miller previously coached the Musketeers from 2004 to 2009.

Offseason

Departures

Incoming transfers

Recruiting classes

2022 recruiting class

2023 recruiting class

Roster

Schedule and results

|-
!colspan=9 style=| Exhibition

|-
!colspan=9 style=| Non-conference regular season

|-
!colspan=9 style=| Big East regular season

|-
!colspan=9 style=| Big East tournament

|-
!colspan=9 style=""|NCAA tournament

Source

Rankings

*AP does not release post-NCAA Tournament rankings.

References

Xavier Musketeers men's basketball seasons
Xavier
Xavier
Xavier
Xavier